Kiribati is a nation in the Pacific Ocean.

Kiribati may also refer to:
 I-Kiribati, a person from Kiribati, or of Kiribati descent
 Kiribati language or Gilbertese

See also 
 Outline of Kiribati